Madrugada may refer to:

 Madrugada (band), a Norwegian rock band
 Madrugada (Madrugada album), a 2008 album by Madrugada
 Madrugada (film), a 1957 Argentinian film
 Madrugada (Melanie album), a 1974 album by Melanie Safka
 "Madrugada" (song), Portugal's 1975 Eurovision entry

See also
Blue hour